The Düsseldorf International Boat Show, more commonly known as boot Düsseldorf or just boot is one of the world's premier boat shows.

With some 1,600 exhibitors from over 50 countries, boot Düsseldorf is considered a benchmark for the international boat and water sports industry. Unparalleled at other major boat shows, large vessels up to 180 grt can be looked on in their entirety, as the exhibition is a complete indoor event. Boot Düsseldorf is held annually at Messe Düsseldorf, Germany, for the duration of a week in the end of January.

History 

The 1st Düsseldorf Boat Show was opened on 27 November 1969. It started with 116 exhibitors from eight countries, an exhibition space of 11,000 square metres and 34,000 visitors. The following year 183 exhibitors presented yachts and water sports equipment on 21,000 sqm to 40,000 visitors. In January 1972, the boot was first held within the new and current Messe premises in Düsseldorf-Stockum and functioned as a forum for preparations of the 1972 Summer Olympics in Munich. In 1976, Canada became the first partner country of the Düsseldorf Boat Show. In 1979 a glazed 8 x 4 x 4 meter saturation diving tower by Preussag AG was presented at boot Düsseldorf. The 1981 show was themed "marine science", with underwater photography showcased by Swiss oceanographer Jacques Piccard.

Visitor numbers peaked in 1992 with just over 400,000 and have gone down since, while the number of exhibitors has overall stayed constant. Also during the early 1990s, super yachts were introduced in Düsseldorf. The Lisbon Expo '98 became partner of the boot in 1998, with the common theme "The Oceans, a Heritage for the Future" and presentations by French environmentalist Jean-Michel Cousteau. The European Yacht of the Year Award was initiated by Yacht magazine in 2001 and since voted by eleven leading European sailing magazines and presented at boot Düsseldorf. Exhibition floor area reached a record 220,000 square metres at the show's 40th anniversary in 2008. The boot 2010 set records with over 150 premieres (of those twenty world premieres), among others for alternative fuel sailing and motor yachts.

The Düsseldorf International Boat Show is tailored as a professional trade fair, showcasing state of the art developments in the yacht and entire water sports industry. Next to sailing and motor yachts, diving is one of the most visited sections of the exhibition. The fact, it is located inland and at the heart of the European megalopolis, distinguishes it from e.g. the Salone Nautico Internazionale at Genoa, Italy, which is of a comparable size but more of a boat show in the proper sense. As a long-time partner of Kiel Week and an industry knowledge base, boot and boot.de is also the largest German internet portal for water sports.

2009

Production yacht introductions 

Sailing yachts

 Bavaria 35cruiser 
 Bavaria 43cruiser  
 Bénéteau Océanis 31  
 Bénéteau First 45 
 CNB Bordeaux 60  
 Contest 60CS  
 Corsair Dash 750  
 Delphia 26 
 Dragonfly 28 
 Dufour 45 
 Enigma 34 
 Feeling 55 
 Grand Soleil 43 OT  
 Hallberg-Rassy 372  
 Jeanneau Sun Odyssey 30i 
 Jeanneau Sun Odyssey 33i  
 Moody 45 DS 
 Najad 505 
 Saffier 26 
 Salona 34 
 Sirius 32 DS 
 Southerly 32 
 Sunreef 70 Seazen II 
 Swan 90 
 Xc 45 

Motor yachts

 ABIM-Classic
 Absolute 40 
 Aquanaut Global Voyager 1700 
 Aquare 1200 & 1500   
 Atlantis 50x4 
 Atlantis 54 
 Bénéteau Antarès 8  
 Bénéteau Flyer 650 Sun Deck  
 Bénéteau Monte Carlo 27 
 Drettmann Elegance 60 Open 
 Fairline's Squadron 55  
 Ferretti 510 
 Galeon 390 & 530 
 Itama FiftyFive 
 Jeanneau Merry Fisher 815 
 Jeanneau Prestige 50 
 Marex 370 Aft Cabin Cruiser 
 Minor Offshore 25 
 Nimbus 335 Coupé 
 Numarine 55 Sport & 55 Fly 
 Pershing 64' 
 Princess 85 Motor Yacht 
 Quicksilver 520 Sport 
 Ranger 21 
 Sea Ray 205 Sport 
 Sealine SC47 
 Silvestris 23' Sports Cabriolet 
 Sunseeker 86 Yacht 
 Targa 23.1 
 Tournament 52

Concept yacht introductions 

Sailing yachts

 Baltic 112 

Motor yachts

 70 Sunreef Power Jumbo   
 Boarncruiser 50' Retro Line  
 Sunseeker Predator 74

2010

Production yacht introductions 
Sailing yachts under 10 m (under 30 feet)

 Bavaria Cruiser 32 
 blu26
 Comet 21 
 Corsair Dash 750 
 Dayracer 29 
 Dehler 32 
 Delphia 33.3
 Deltania 20.5 S
 Deltania 25 S
 Deltania 30 
 Elan 310 
 Far East 26 
 Hallberg-Rassy 310 
 Hobie Wildcat 
 J97
 Laser Bug 
 Narca F20 Carbon 
 ONYX
 RS 100 
 S-950 
 S-700 
 S-500 
 Saffier 23 ft 
 Scangaard 21 "Nightstar"
 Scandinavian Cruiser 20 
 Seascape 18 
 Scandinavia 27 
 Sunbeam 30.1 
 Tofinou 9.5 m
 Tofinou 8.0 m
 Tofinou 7.0 m
 Trimaran Astus 22 
 Varianta VA18 

Sailing yachts 10 – 12 m (30 – 40 feet)

 Arcona 340 
 Arcona 370 
 Bavaria 35cruiser 
 Bavaria 38cruiser 
 C-Yacht 10.50 
 First 35
 Fricke & Dannhus HD 36 Retro 
 Nordship 360 DS 
 Hallberg-Rassy 372 
 Hanse 375
 Lipari 41
 OVNI 365
 Pacer 376 
 Sirius 35 DS 
 Sunbeam 34.2 
 X-34 

Sailing yachts 12 – 14 m (40 – 50 feet)

 Bavaria 40cruiser 
 Dehler 45 
 Dufour 40 E Performance 
 Dufour 45 Performance 
 C-Yacht 12.50 
 Elan 450 
 Feeling 44‘
 Hallberg-Rassy 40
 Najad 410 
 Najad 460 Aphrodite 
 Maxi 1300 
 Malö 40 
 Salona 44 
 Sunbeam 42.1
 Sun Odyssey 42 DS 
 Xc 45 

Sailing yachts over 14 m (over 50 feet)

 Bavaria Cruiser 45 
 Bavaria Cruiser 55 
 Catana 47 
 Contest 50 CS 
 Corsair 50 
 Grand Soleil 46 
 Hallberg-Rassy 48 
 Hallberg-Rassy 54 
 Hallberg-Rassy 64 
 Hanse 545 
 Jeanneau 53 
 Jeanneau 57 
 Oceanis 50 
 Oceanis 58 
 Oyster 575 
 Solaris One 60‘
 Southerly 49 

Motor yachts

 ABIM-Classic 118
 Admirals Tender Sport
 Antares 6.80 Outboard  
 Antares 42'S
 Antares 30'S 
 Aquanaut Global Voyager 1500 
 Arcadia 85
 Boarncruiser 50‘ Retro Line
 Cap Camarat 635 DC 
 Drettmann Bandido 66
 Drettmann Elegance 68
 Drettmann Elegance 122 RPH
 Dymax Voltage 5.45
 Emocean Marine's Voodoo 27
 Ferretti 510
 Fleming 65'
 Frauscher 600 Riviera 
 Frauscher 717 GT
 Galia 570 Sundeck  
 Greenline 33
 Jeanneau Leader 9 
 Linssen Grand Sturdy 25.9 Sedan
 Merry Fisher 645
 Milos V 580 Bowrider 
 Mochi 54 Dolphin
 Nimbus 25 Paragon 
 Nimbus 27 E-power 
 Pershing 46
 Pershing 56
 Predator 54
 Predator 60
 Prestige 42
 Prestige 39
 Princess V 62
 Princess V 78
 Rodman Muse 44
 Sanlorenzo 62
 Scorpion RIBs Sting
 Sealine F46
 Sea Ray 220 Sundeck
 Sea Ray 235 Weekender
 Sea Ray 305 Sundancer 
 Selene 49
 Smartboat 23‘ 
 Squadron 68
 Stromberg 46'
 Sunseeker Portofino 48
 Sunseeker 88 
 Swift Trawler 34 Sedan
 Targa 44 Open
 Targa 58 Gran Turismo 
 Stingray 225CR 
 Stingray 250CR 
 Stingray 250CS

Concept yacht introductions 

Sailing yachts

 Feeling 48 
 Futura 
 Jongert 5200M 
 Solaris One 44 
 Xc 42

Awards

European Yacht of the Year 
The European Yacht of the Year Award was initiated by Yacht magazine of Germany at boot in 2001 and has since been voted in co-operation with national magazines Badnyt Denmark, Batnytt Sweden, Fare Vela Italy, Seilas Norway, Swissboat Yachting Switzerland, Voile Magazine France, Waterkampioen the Netherlands, Yacht Revue Austria, Yachting World England and Yate Spain.

European Powerboat of the Year 

The European Powerboat of the Year Award was initiated by BOOTE magazine of Germany at boot in 2005 and has since been voted in co-operation with national magazines Barche a Motore Italy, Neptune France, Marina CH Switzerland, Yachtrevue Austria, Batliv Norway, and Vene Finland.

See also 

 List of sailboat designers and manufacturers
 List of water sports
 Shipbuilding companies of Germany

References

External links 
 

 boot Düsseldorf  
 Bundesverband Wassersportwirtschaft e.V. (BVWW) 
 Messe Düsseldorf 

Boat shows
Events in Düsseldorf
Trade fairs in Germany
Recurring events established in 1969
Tourist attractions in Düsseldorf
1969 establishments in West Germany